Słomianka may refer to the following places:
Słomianka, Białystok County in Podlaskie Voivodeship (north-east Poland)
Słomianka, Mońki County in Podlaskie Voivodeship (north-east Poland)
Słomianka, Sokółka County in Podlaskie Voivodeship (north-east Poland)